The Verden Magic Park is an amusement park in Verden (Aller) in North Germany, which lies on the A 27 motorway between Hanover and Bremen. The park describes itself as "Germany's only amusement park for magic!". Accordingly, it has specialised in the areas of magic and fairy tales. It is also a stop on the  German Fairy Tale Route.

External links 
 Magic Park Verden 

Tourist attractions in Lower Saxony
Verden an der Aller
Amusement parks in Germany
Buildings and structures in Lower Saxony